George W. Della (February 9, 1908 – August 11, 1990) was a politician and businessman from the U.S. state of Maryland. Trained as a lawyer, Della was appointed to the Maryland Senate in 1939 to represent a district in Baltimore and served until his retirement from politics. He served as President of the Maryland Senate from 1951 to 1955 and again from 1959 to 1963. Following his retirement in 1963, Della worked as a lobbyist for Baltimore Gas and Electric. His son, George W. Della, Jr., was a member of the Baltimore City Council from 1976 to 1983 and the Maryland Senate representing South Baltimore from 1983 to 2010.

Biography
George W. Della was born February 9, 1908, in Baltimore, Maryland. He attained his education locally, attending Baltimore Public Schools and the Baltimore City College, from which he graduated in 1927. He went on to earn a Bachelor of Arts degree in Business Administration from the University of Baltimore in 1932 and, three years later, earned a law degree from that institution's School of Law. By 1936, Della had passed the Maryland Bar and begun to practice law, and the same year he was wed to Agnes H. Mattare, with whom he had three children, George, Mary, and Howard.

As a lifelong resident of Baltimore, Della was active in a number of community organizations. He was a member of Baltimore's Episcopal Church of the Advent and of the Baltimore Country Club, and as a Director of the American Bankers Life Insurance Company of Florida and the South Baltimore General Hospital. Della was also a long-time member of the Freemasons. In 1959 the Boumi Temple of the Shrine, part of the Freemason organization commonly referred to as the Shriners, made him potentate.

In 1939, Governor Herbert R. O'Conor appointed Della to the Maryland Senate as the Senator from Baltimore's 6th district. He served in a variety of leadership roles, including as Chair of the Insurance and Loans Committee and the Judicial Proceedings Committee. Della was elected to serve as President of the Maryland Senate in 1951, and continued in that role until 1955. In 1959, he was again elected President, a position which he did not relinquish again until his retirement in 1963. Following his retirement, Della was hired as a lobbyist in 1967 by the Baltimore Gas and Electric Company, now Constellation Energy. He continued to play a role in Maryland politics, most prominently as a delegate to the state constitutional convention in 1967. Della retired in 1985, and died in 1990. His son George W. Della, Jr. followed in his father's footsteps, winning election as a Senator from Baltimore's 47th district in 1983 and remaining Senator in a redistricted 46th district in 2003 until his primary defeat in September 2010.

References

Politicians from Baltimore
Maryland state senators
University of Baltimore alumni
1908 births
1990 deaths
Businesspeople from Baltimore
20th-century American businesspeople
20th-century American politicians